Mimi Leahey was an actor in the 1970s who became an American television soap opera script writer.

Positions held
All My Children
 Script Editor (July 1999 - May 13, 2004)

Another World
 Script Writer (1988–1998)

As the World Turns
 Script Writer (January 18, 2007 - August 10, 2007)

Awards and nominations
Daytime Emmy Award
Nomination, 2001–2004, Best Writing, All My Children
Nomination, 1994 & 1996, Best Writing, Another World

Writers Guild of America Award
Win, 2000, 2001 & 2003, Best Writing All My Children
Nomination, 1999, Best Writing, All My Children
Nomination, 1995 & 1997, Best Writing, Another World

References

External links

American soap opera writers
American screenwriters
Year of birth missing (living people)
Place of birth missing (living people)
Living people
Daytime Emmy Award winners
American women television writers
American women screenwriters
Writers Guild of America Award winners
Women soap opera writers
21st-century American women